Wormley may refer to:

Places

Wormley, Hertfordshire, a village in the Borough of Broxbourne, Hertfordshire, England
Wormley, Surrey, a village in Surrey, England
Sykehouse#Wormley_Hill, a hamlet in the Metropolitan Borough of Doncaster, South Yorkshire, England

People
James Wormley (1819-1884), owner and operator of the Wormley Hotel, Washington D.C.
Edward Wormley (1907-1970), an American furniture designer
Paul Wormley (b. 1961), an English former professional footballer
James Wormley Jones (1884–1958), an African-American FBI special agent